Dogs with Jobs is a Canadian documentary television series about working dogs and show dogs. Each half-hour episode consists of two to three segments on individual dogs from around the world.  The family-friendly series has featured service dogs, search and rescue dogs, police dogs, herding dogs, and others. Segments show footage of dogs on the job, and also include stories of their rescue, training, and relationships with their owners and handlers.

Production and broadcast

The idea for the series came from Canadian writer Merrily Weisbord and her daughter, veterinarian Kim Kachanoff. They made use of a "doggie-cam", giving viewers a glimpse into the dog's perspective.

Weisbord and Kachanoff sold the show to Cineflix producer Glen Salzman, who presented it in a "market simulation" at the September 7, 1998 Banff International Television Festival. The series premiered on Canada's Life Network (now Slice), where it received positive ratings and reviews, before premiering in the US a year later in the form of a 90-minute compilation during a PBS pledge drive.

The series is produced by Cineflix, in association with Slice in Canada and the National Geographic Channel internationally. The series' initial run lasted five seasons, from January 8, 2000 to September 7, 2004, including 65 episodes, and airing in 57 countries. As of November 2014, the first three seasons were available on Netflix instant streaming. As of February 2016, the first two seasons were available to stream on Netflix instant streaming.

Reception
In his The New York Times review, film critic Matthew Hays wrote that "the gently narrated, heartwarming stories of Dogs With Jobs are certainly the antithesis of other reality-based animal programming like Fox's When Animals Attack!", and called the show "as simple and as slightly absurd as its name".

The series earned a cult following and achieved strong international sales. Said executive producer Glen Salzman, "This show really does work like magic with audiences." The series was featured on a segment of The Oprah Winfrey Show on September 4, 2000.

Common Sense Media awarded the show four out of five stars for quality, and three out of five points for inclusion of positive messages. They deemed it appropriate for children aged five and older, calling it "a good TV choice for the family" and "a great way to introduce kids to the idea of a 'working dog' so that they can recognize and respect those they might meet in everyday life."

Animals at Work dispute
On September 3, 2012, Merrily Weisbord, who developed the show, sued Cineflix and producer Glen Salzman in Quebec Superior Court for $400,000 over their program Animals at Work, also called Frisky Business. Weisbord alleged that the program was a knockoff or sequel of Dogs with Jobs, having the same structure, and even featuring at least fifteen of the same dogs.

Episodes

See also
K-9 to 5, an American television series about working dogs.

References

Television shows about dogs

2000s Canadian documentary television series
2000 Canadian television series debuts
2004 Canadian television series endings
Television series by Cineflix
Slice (TV channel) original programming
National Geographic (American TV channel) original programming